The Iceman Cometh is a 1939 play by Eugene O'Neill.

The Iceman Cometh may also refer to:

Film and TV
 "The Iceman Cometh" (The Play of the Week), November 14 and 21, 1960 two-episode NTA broadcast of O'Neill's play, directed by Sidney Lumet
 The Iceman Cometh (1973 film), American Film Theatre production of O'Neill's play, directed by John Frankenheimer
 The Iceman Cometh (1989 film) (Ji dong ji xia), Hong Kong martial arts fantasy directed by Clarence Fok Yiu-leung
 The Iceman Cometh (2014 film), Hong Kong–Chinese 3D martial arts action-comedy remake of 1989 film, a/k/a Iceman

Music
The Ice Man Cometh (album), 1968 album by American performer Jerry Butler

See also
Iceman (disambiguation)